Thomas Miller (born 1883) was a Scottish footballer who played for Falkirk, Chelsea and Dundee Hibernian, mainly as a left back.

He was part of the Falkirk team which finished runners-up in the 1909–10 Scottish Division One, having returned to Scotland after being released by Chelsea, where he was recruited as one of the initial batch of players after the club was formed, and remained in West London for four seasons. He took part in the first Scottish Football League fixtures played by both Falkirk in 1902 and Dundee Hibernian (later Dundee United) in 1910, and the first English Football League match played by Chelsea in 1905. After World War I, aged in his late 30s, he made a comeback of sorts with St Bernard's and Bathgate.

Miller was selected once for the Scottish Football League XI in 1910.

References

1883 births
Year of death unknown
Scottish footballers
Footballers from Edinburgh
Falkirk F.C. players
Chelsea F.C. players
Dundee United F.C. players
St Bernard's F.C. players
Bathgate F.C. players
Scottish Football League players
Scottish Football League representative players
English Football League players
Association football defenders
Scottish Junior Football Association players